The 2017 Copa Sudamericana second stage was played from 27 June to 9 August 2017. A total of 32 teams competed in the second stage to decide the 16 places in the final stages of the 2017 Copa Sudamericana.

Draw

The draw for the second stage was held on 14 June 2017, 20:00 PYT (UTC−4), at the CONMEBOL Convention Center in Luque, Paraguay. For the second stage, the teams were allocated to two pots according to their previous results in this season:
Pot 1: 10 teams transferred from the Copa Libertadores and six best winners of the first stage from the Copa Sudamericana
Pot 2: 16 remaining winners of the first stage from the Copa Sudamericana

The 32 teams were drawn into 16 ties (O1–O16) between a team from Pot 1 and a team from Pot 2, with the teams from Pot 1 hosting the second leg. Teams from the same association could be drawn into the same tie.

The following were the 10 teams transferred from the Copa Libertadores (two best teams eliminated in the third stage of qualifying and eight third-placed teams in the group stage).

The following were the 22 winners of the first stage from the Copa Sudamericana. Matches in the first stage were considered for the ranking of teams for the second stage draw.

Format

In the second stage, each tie was played on a home-and-away two-legged basis. If tied on aggregate, the away goals rule would be used. If still tied, extra time would not be played, and the penalty shoot-out would be used to determine the winner (Regulations Article 6.1).

The 16 winners of the second stage advanced to the round of 16 of the knockout stages.

Matches
The first legs were played on 27–29 June, 5–6 and 11–13 July, and the second legs were played on 25–27 July, 1–3 and 9 August 2017.

|}

Match O1

Racing won 6–3 on aggregate and advanced to the round of 16 (Match A).

Match O2

Tied 2–2 on aggregate, Junior won on penalties and advanced to the round of 16 (Match B).

Match O3

Flamengo won 10–2 on aggregate and advanced to the round of 16 (Match C).

Match O4

Estudiantes won 3–0 on aggregate and advanced to the round of 16 (Match D).

Match O5

Independiente won 6–3 on aggregate and advanced to the round of 16 (Match E).

Match O6

Tied 1–1 on aggregate, LDU Quito won on penalties and advanced to the round of 16 (Match F).

Match O7

Ponte Preta won 4–1 on aggregate and advanced to the round of 16 (Match G).

Match O8

Santa Fe won 2–1 on aggregate and advanced to the round of 16 (Match H).

Match O9

Libertad won 7–1 on aggregate and advanced to the round of 16 (Match H).

Match O10

Sport Recife won 3–2 on aggregate and advanced to the round of 16 (Match G).

Match O11

Fluminense won 6–1 on aggregate and advanced to the round of 16 (Match F).

Match O12

Atlético Tucumán won 6–2 on aggregate and advanced to the round of 16 (Match E).

Match O13

Tied 3–3 on aggregate, Nacional won on away goals and advanced to the round of 16 (Match D).

Match O14

Tied 1–1 on aggregate, Chapecoense won on penalties and advanced to the round of 16 (Match C).

Match O15

Cerro Porteño won 6–2 on aggregate and advanced to the round of 16 (Match B).

Match O16

Corinthians won 3–1 on aggregate and advanced to the round of 16 (Match A).

References

External links
CONMEBOL Sudamericana 2017, CONMEBOL.com 

2
June 2017 sports events in South America
July 2017 sports events in South America
August 2017 sports events in South America